The Noble County Sheriff's House and Jail, also known as the Old Jail Museum, is a historic jail and residence located in Albion, Noble County, Indiana.  It was built in 1875 by Thomas J. Tolan and Son, Architects of Fort Wayne, Indiana. It is a -story, red brick building with combined Second Empire and Gothic Revival style design elements.  It features round-arched windows, a three-story projecting entrance tower, and a mansard roof.

It was listed on the National Register of Historic Places in 1982.  It is located in the Albion Courthouse Square Historic District.

References

External links
Noble County Historical Society

Government buildings completed in 1875
Infrastructure completed in 1875
Jails on the National Register of Historic Places in Indiana
Historic house museums in Indiana
Museums in Noble County, Indiana
Prison museums in Indiana
Second Empire architecture in Indiana
Gothic Revival architecture in Indiana
National Register of Historic Places in Noble County, Indiana
Historic district contributing properties in Indiana
Jails in Indiana
Houses on the National Register of Historic Places in Indiana